The Diplomatic Academy of Vienna (DA; German: Diplomatische Akademie Wien), also known as the Vienna School of International Studies, is a postgraduate professional school based in Vienna, Austria, with focused training for students and professionals in the areas of international affairs, political science, law, languages, history and economics.

The school confers PhD degrees, Master's degrees and postgraduate diplomas upon its graduates. It is an affiliate member school of the Association of Professional Schools of International Affairs in Austria. The Diplomatic Academy's director (since 2017) is Ambassador Emil Brix (b. 1956 in Vienna), an Austrian diplomat and historian.

History
The academy was originally established by Empress Maria Theresa in 1754 as the Oriental Academy, for the purpose of training young diplomats to represent the Habsburg Empire abroad.

The school was renamed multiple times and reorganized over the centuries, and it eventually gained independent public institution status in 1996. Given its roots, the Diplomatic Academy claims to be the oldest school of its kind, one that is dedicated to professional foreign affairs training.

Academics
The academy offers graduate degrees only. Students may choose to pursue a two-year program that leads towards either a Master of Advanced International Studies (MAIS) or a Master of Science in Environmental Technology and International Affairs (MSc ETIA) degree.

The MAIS program is run in conjunction with the University of Vienna, while the MSc ETIA courses are offered in partnership with the Technical University of Vienna. A one-year "Diploma Programme" is also available to postgraduates.

Directors of the academy 
Heinrich Pfusterschmid-Hardtenstein, 1978–1986
Alfred Missong jun., 1986–1994
Paul Leifer, 1994–1999 
Ernst Sucharipa, 1999–2003 
Jiří Gruša, 2004–2008
Hans Winkler, 2008–2017
Emil Brix, 2017–present

Notable people
A number of prominent figures in politics, economics and law have associations with the Diplomatic Academy:
Celso Amorim – former Brazilian Minister of Defence and Foreign Minister and ambassador to the United Kingdom. Amorim graduated from the academy in 1967.
Jiří Gruša – Czech poet and former Czech ambassador to Austria. Served as the academy's director from 2005 to 2009.
Valentin Inzko – Austrian diplomat, former High Representative for Bosnia and Herzegovina. Graduated in 1974.
 Jan Kickert (born 1964) – Austrian Permanent Representative to the United Nations.
Kolinda Grabar-Kitarović – 4th President of the Republic of Croatia.
Heinz Schaden – Austrian Social Democratic Party politician and former mayor of Salzburg. Attended DA in the 1980s.
Kurt Waldheim – former President of Austria and Secretary-General of the United Nations. Graduated from the academy (then known as the Vienna Consular Academy) in 1939.
Igor Lukšić – Foreign Minister of Montenegro and former Prime Minister. Graduated in 1999.

References

External links

 
 

Schools of international relations
Diplomatic training